Ghar Ki Laaj is a 1979 Bollywood film directed by B. R. Ishara. It starred Moushumi Chatterjee and Sanjeev Kumar with lyrics and. music by Ravindra Jain.

Cast
Moushumi Chatterjee
Sanjeev Kumar      
Aruna Irani   
Sohrab Modi   
Deven Verma

Music
"Aayi Hain Aayi Hain Phir Se Bahaaren" - Hemlata
"Chhoti Raani Doobi Rahe Saaj Singaar Mein" - Manna Dey
"Maiya Ke Bina Beta Jaise Panchhi Kate Par Ka" - Mahendra Kapoor
"Mandir Mandir Bhatkaye" - Mohammed Rafi

External links
 

1979 films
1970s Hindi-language films
Films scored by Ravindra Jain
Films directed by B. R. Ishara